Saint-Jean-Pied-de-Port (literally "Saint John [at the] Foot of [the] Pass";) is a commune in the Pyrénées-Atlantiques department in south-western France. It is close to Ostabat in the Pyrenean foothills. The town is also the old capital of the traditional Basque province of Lower Navarre. Saint-Jean-Pied-de-Port is also a starting point for the French Way Camino Francés, the most popular option for travelling the Camino de Santiago.

Geography
The town lies on the river Nive,  from the Spanish border, and is the head town of the region of Basse-Navarre (Lower Navarre in English) and was classified among the Most Beautiful Villages of France in 2016. The Pays de Saint-Jean-Pied-de-Port, also called Pays de Cize (Garazi in Basque), is the region surrounding Saint-Jean-Pied-Port. The town's layout is essentially one main street with sandstone walls encircling.

Neighbouring towns and villages
 Saint-Jean-le-Vieux
 Ossès
 Baigorri
 Estérençuby
 Ispoure
 Uhart-Cize
 Arnéguy
 Luzaide/Valcarlos (Spain)

History

The original town at nearby Saint-Jean-le-Vieux was razed to the ground in 1177 by the troops of Richard the Lionheart after a siege. The Kings of Navarre refounded the town on its present site shortly afterwards.

The town was thereafter a town of the Kingdom of Navarre, and the seat of the sheriff of the Lower Navarre district ("merindad" of Ultrapuertos or Deça-Ports). It remained as such up to the period of the Spanish conquest (1512-1528) when King Henry II of Navarre decided to transfer the seat of the royal institutions to Saint Palais (Donapaleu) on safety grounds.

The town has traditionally been an important point on the Way of St. James, the pilgrimage to Santiago de Compostela, as it stands at the base of the Roncevaux Pass across the Pyrenees. Pied-de-Port means 'foot of the pass' in Pyrenean French. The routes from Paris, Vézelay and Le Puy-en-Velay meet at Saint-Jean-Pied-de-Port and it was the pilgrims' last stop before the arduous mountain crossing.

In 1998, the Porte St-Jacques  (city gate) was added to the UNESCO World Heritage Sites as part of the sites along the Routes of Santiago de Compostela in France.

Main sights
The cobbled rue de la Citadelle runs down hill and over the river from the fifteenth century Porte St-Jacques to the Porte d'Espagne by the bridge. From the bridge, there are views of the old houses with balconies overlooking the Nive. Many of the buildings are very old, built of pink and grey schist, and retain distinctive features, including inscriptions over their doors. One, a bakery, lists the price of wheat in 1789.

The 14th-century red schist Gothic church, Notre-Dame-du-Bout-du-Pont, stands by the Porte d'Espagne. The original was built by Sancho the Strong of Navarre to commemorate the 1212 Battle of Las Navas de Tolosa where Moorish dominance of Spain was undermined.

Above the town at the top of the hill is the citadel, remodelled by Vauban in the 17th century.

Outside the walls is a new town, with the Hôtel de Ville and a pelota fronton.

Economy
Traditional crafts and foods remain in the town, including Basque linen from the Inchauspé family since 1848. The town is now an important tourist centre for the Pyrenees and the French Basque country and there are shops, restaurants and hotels.

St-Jean-Pied-de-Port specializes in goat cheese, like the Ossau-Iraty AOP cheese, artisanal trout breeding and piperade omelette with peppers and Bayonne ham.

Mondays see a large market, with sheep and cattle driven into the town. At 5pm, there is a communal game of bare-handed pelote at the fronton. There are large fairs four times a year.

Transportation
Saint-Jean-Pied-de-Port station is the southern terminus of the railway line from Bayonne through the French Basque Country, along the valley of the river Nive, with several services each day. It is 1 km from the centre of the town. Biarritz Airport is the closest airport to Saint Jean Pied de Port.

Notable people
 Bernard Etxepare (late 15th - mid 16th century), writer of first printed book in Basque.
 Juan Huarte de San Juan (c. 1530-1592), physician and psychologist was born there.
 Charles Floquet (1828–1896), born in Saint-Jean-Pied-de-Port, French lawyer and statesman.
 Imanol Harinordoquy (born 1980), French international rugby union player, grew up in the town.

See also
Communes of the Pyrénées-Atlantiques department

References

External links

  
 Tourist office website Tourist office website
 Saint Jean Pied de Port Secret World
 Webpage about the fortifications 
 Tourism in basque country

Communes of Pyrénées-Atlantiques
Lower Navarre
World Heritage Sites in France
Pyrénées-Atlantiques communes articles needing translation from French Wikipedia
Vauban fortifications in France